Alfred Batson was an American lawyer and politician. A resident of Recluse, Mississippi, he represented Stone County in the Mississippi House of Representatives from 1917 to 1920. In 1916, he defeated J. M. Culpeper in an election to represent the newly formed Stone County in the Mississippi House of Representatives, with a vote of 384 to 323. He ran for re-election in 1919, but lost the Democratic primary to John M. "Mack" Alexander.

References 

Year of birth missing
Year of death missing
Democratic Party members of the Mississippi House of Representatives
People from Stone County, Mississippi